The Maximilian Museum is a large, public museum housed in a palatial building erected in 1546 in Augsburg, Germany. It houses a notable collection of decorative arts. Augsburg was the leading German center of sculpture, painting, and, especially, of fine work in gold in silver from the late Middle Ages until the modern period.

The museum was opened in 1855.

External links
 Official website
 Augsburg sightseeing: Maximilian Museum

Decorative arts museums in Germany
Buildings and structures in Augsburg
1855 establishments in Bavaria
Museums established in 1855
Museums in Bavaria